Kingi Areta Keiha  (24 December 1900 – 29 May 1961) was a New Zealand law clerk, interpreter, soldier, Māori welfare officer and farmer. Of Māori descent, he identified with the Rongowhakaata, Te Aitanga-a-Hauiti and Te Aitanga-a-Mahaki iwi. He was born in Gisborne, East Coast, New Zealand on 24 December 1900. His father was Mikaere (Mikaera) Pare Keiha Turangi, brother of Heni Materoa Carroll, who was married to Sir James Carroll.

Keiha reached battalion command of the 28th Māori Battalion during its last action in North Africa.

References

1900 births
1961 deaths
20th-century translators
Interpreters
New Zealand farmers
New Zealand Māori public servants
New Zealand Māori soldiers
People from Gisborne, New Zealand
New Zealand recipients of the Military Cross
Rongowhakaata people
Te Aitanga-a-Hauiti people
Te Aitanga-a-Māhaki people